The eighth edition of cricket's Asia Cup (also called Indian Oil Asia Cup) was held in Sri Lanka after a gap of 4 years. Sri Lanka beat India in the final to win the cup. The 4 test playing Asian nations participated in the tournament along with, for the first time, leading Asian associate nations, the UAE and Hong Kong.

Squads

Venues

Group stage

Group A

Group B

Super Fours

Final

References

External links 
 

2004
2004 in Sri Lankan cricket
International cricket competitions in 2004
Cricket, Asia Cup, 2004
International cricket competitions in Sri Lanka